Itado Dam is a gravity dam located in Akita Prefecture in Japan. The dam is used for power production. The catchment area of the dam is 182.3 km2. The dam impounds about 21  ha of land when full and can store 1598 thousand cubic meters of water. The construction of the dam was started on 1980 and completed in 1983.

References

Dams in Akita Prefecture
1983 establishments in Japan